Picard Brothers are a duo of record producers, songwriters and DJs composed by Maxime Picard and Clément Picard. The two French brothers have worked on records by Diplo, Mark Ronson, Silk City, Beyoncé, Madonna and many others throughout their career. They won a Grammy Award in 2019 for Best Dance Recording for their contribution to "Electricity" by Silk City and Dua Lipa.

They also release their own artist project under the name Picard Brothers.

Career 
Picard Brothers started their music career at an early age and produced beats for French rappers.

In 2011, they met and started working closely with Diplo, became part of his core production crew. They quickly signed their first Platinum certified song "It Won't Stop" by Sevyn Streeter and Chris Brown

Working between Paris and Los Angeles, they have been involved in many Diplo and Major Lazer releases such as "Powerful" with Ellie Goulding and Tarrus Riley, "Look Back" with DRAM.

In 2018, they met Mark Ronson and helped in the creation of Silk City: they co-signed the Grammy winning hit "Electricity" amongst the other singles. They continued working with Mark Ronson and co-wrote and co-produced his latest album Late Night Feelings including the single "Nothing Breaks Like a Heart" with Miley Cyrus.

The duo also wrote and produced for other artists like Beyoncé, Kehlani, Miley Cyrus, Yebba,  Wizkid, Mr Eazi and more.

Picard Brothers released their artist project in 2020 with the single "Won't Let Go",  remixed by House legend Todd Edwards. They are now working on their debut album.

Discography

EPs
 Blessing in This House (Island Records UK, 2021)
 Won't Let Go (Island Records UK, 2021)

Singles
 Best of Me (Island Records UK/Because Music, 2021)
 It's Not Over (Island Records UK, 2020)
 Running From My Life (Records Collection, 2017)
 Goodbye & Good Luck (Pelican Fly, 2014)

Remixes

Songwriting and production credits

References 

French record producers
Year of birth missing (living people)
Sibling musical duos
French musical duos
French electronic music groups
Island Records artists
French songwriters
Male songwriters
French DJs
Male musical duos
Grammy Award winners